The Border Surrender were an English rock band based in North London. The band members were Keith Austin (vocals and guitar), Simon Shields (vocals, guitar, bass guitar and mandolin), Johnny Manning (keyboards, melodica, glockenspiel & accordion) and Mark Austin (drums and vocals). They were signed under Smoky Carrot Records.

Live performances
The band performed energetic live performances with multiple instrument changes between the four members. One of their first filmed live performances was on BalconyTV London., the leading online viral music show, performing 'Oh Mary'. across the lock in Camden Town.

In the media
Their first EP Blood in the Snow was released in April 2009 receiving positive industry reviews including:

 The Word
 The Word - Now Hear This, "15 brand-new Tracks picked by The Word".
 Americana UK.
 Ray-Ban Rooms.
 London Tour Dates Magazine.
 Oh, Inverted World.

Their single "Oh Mary" received further positive industry reviews including:

 Music Week.
 The Ruckus.
 Loud Horizon.
 Nostalgia for Infinity.
 Losing Today.
 The Camden Store.

A snapshot of radio plays include:
BBC Radio 2, Dermot O'Leary.
BBC 6 Music, BBC Introducing with Tom Robinson.

References

External links 
 MySpace
 Facebook
 Twitter
 YouTube
 BBC Music
 last.fm

English rock music groups